Chofetz Chaim is a book written by Rabbi Yisrael Meir Kagan about the Jewish laws regarding harmful speech.

Chofetz Chaim (Hebrew: חָפֵץ חַיִּים, sometimes styled Hafetz Haim) may also refer to:
 Rabbi Israel Meir Kagan, often known by the name of his famous book instead of his given name

Yeshivos
Yeshiva Chofetz Chaim of Radin, a Suffern, New York
Yeshivas Chofetz Chaim or Yeshivas Rabbeinu Yisrael Meir HaKohen / Rabbinical Seminary of America, Queens, New York
Talmudical Institute of Upstate New York (known as Yeshivas Chofetz Chaim of Rochester), an affiliate of Yeshivas Rabbeinu Yisrael Meir HaKohen
Yeshiva Chofetz Chaim of Baltimore; see Zelig Pliskin

Other
Chofetz Chaim Heritage Foundation, an American organisation dedicated to spreading the teachings of the Chofetz Chaim book and its author
 Hafetz Haim, a kibbutz in Israel